West Green is an unincorporated community in Coffee County, Georgia, United States.  West Green is located along U.S. Route 221 northeast of Douglas and southwest of Lehigh near the Coffee-Jeff Davis County Line.  The ZIP Code for West Green is 31567.

History
West Green originally was known as The Twenty (due to being 20 miles south of Hazlehurst) and later Garrant.

The Georgia General Assembly incorporated West Green as a town in 1914. The town's municipal charter was repealed in 1995.

References

Former municipalities in Georgia (U.S. state)
Unincorporated communities in Coffee County, Georgia
Unincorporated communities in Georgia (U.S. state)
Populated places disestablished in 1995